Virgibacillus salarius is a bacterium from the genus of Virgibacillus which has been isolated from a salt crust from the Gharsa salt lake from Chott el Gharsa in Tunisia.

References

Bacillaceae
Bacteria described in 2008